Pseudomonas suis is a Gram-negative bacterium that causes croupous pneumonia of swine (genus Sus) from which it derives its name. It was first isolated in the Philippines. The type strain is ATCC 11729.

References

Pseudomonadales
Bacteria described in 1930